The New Castle Commercial Historic District is national historic district located at New Castle, Henry County, Indiana. It encompasses 64 contributing buildings in the central business district of New Castle.  It developed between about the 1849 and 1941, and includes many excellent examples of Italianate, Classical Revival, and Commercial styles of architecture.   Notable sites of interest include the separately listed Henry County Courthouse.  Other notable buildings include the L.A. Jennings Building (1877), Odd Fellows Hall (1875, c. 1895), Murphey Building (c. 1870), Knights of Pythias Building (1891), Masonic Temple (1892), Bradway Building (1902), former United Brethren Church (1863, 1883), Citizens State Bank Building (1923), S.P. Jennings and Sons Handle Factory complex (c. 1890), and Coca-Cola Bottling Building (1905, 1941).

It was added to the National Register of Historic Places in 1991.

References

New Castle, Indiana
Historic districts on the National Register of Historic Places in Indiana
Neoclassical architecture in Indiana
Italianate architecture in Indiana
Historic districts in Henry County, Indiana
National Register of Historic Places in Henry County, Indiana